The Montana meridian extends north and south from the initial monument on the summit of a limestone hill,  high, longitude 111° 39′ 33″ west from Greenwich, and, with the base line on the parallel of 45° 47′ 13″ north latitude, governs the surveys in the state of Montana. The initial point lies near Willow Creek, Montana.

See also
List of principal and guide meridians and base lines of the United States

References

Sources

External links

Meridians and base lines of the United States
Named meridians
Geography of Montana